James McBride (1788–1859) was a prominent pioneer statesman in Butler County, Ohio. He was Hamilton's first Mayor, and a prominent State Representative associated with the canals, archaeologist who supplied a considerable number of sketches of earthworks for early texts on the Mississippi Valley, Ohio's leading pioneer author and antiquarian, Miami University Secretary and President of the Board of Trustees, Butler County's fifth Sheriff, a surveyor, and an officer of other various entities. James McBride married the daughter of Judge Lytle, of the Lytle family of the Ohio River Valley, and was through her kinsman with Sen. Homer T. Bone, and Governor of Ohio Andrew L. Harris. McBride's son in law was Roger N. Stembel, a commander of the Pacific Fleet.

McBride became an ardent convert to John C. Symmes' Hollow Earth theory, and wrote a book in support of it in 1826.

Archaeological work

As an archaeologist, he lived and worked near the Great Miami River, examining evidence of ancient life in the region. A canal engineer, J.W. Erwin, served as his assistant, making surveys of earthworks in the Great Miami River valley. McBride retained his own collection of artifacts. Artifacts and research by McBride was used by Ephraim George Squier and Edwin Hamilton Davis in the Smithsonian Institution publication, Ancient Monuments of the Mississippi Valley.

Legacy

McBride Hall is a dormitory on the Miami University campus named in McBride's memory.

References

Footnotes

Sources
 James McBride, Symmes's theory of concentric spheres : demonstrating that the earth is hollow, habitable within, and widely open about the poles, Cincinnati 1826.
 History of the Butler County, Ohio Sheriff's Office
 John C. Symmes' Hollow Earth Theory
  Stembel family History; see Henry Stembel

1788 births
1859 deaths
American archaeologists
Sportspeople from Hamilton, Ohio
Hollow Earth proponents
Miami University trustees
Members of the Ohio House of Representatives
19th-century American politicians